99 Revolutions Tour was a concert tour by American punk rock band Green Day in support of the band's trilogy, ¡Uno!, ¡Dos! and ¡Tré!, that took place in 2013. The tour was named after the song "99 Revolutions" from ¡Tré!.

Before the announcement of the trilogy, the band had been playing "secret shows", revealing previously unheard songs. The first of these shows was on August 11 at the Tiki Bar  in Costa Mesa, California. After the announcement of the trilogy, the band began performing promotional shows leading up to the tour which kicked off on March 10, 2013, in Pomona, California's Pomona Fox Theater. In 2014 following the 99 Revolutions Tour, Green Day headlined the Soundwave Festival Tour in 2014 in Australia.

The tour was the first time Green Day had ever performed their 1994 album Dookie in its entirety. This was done for five shows towards the end of the tour to celebrate the album's 20th anniversary. This tour is also notable for having the band's first major live shows since its release not to end the show with a performance of "Good Riddance (Time of Your Life)". Rather substituting it for "Brutal Love", the opening rock ballad track that is also featured on ¡Tré!.

Opening acts

All Time Low (Europe) (select dates)
Kaiser Chiefs (London, Oslo)
Stickup Kid (US) (SXSW)
Best Coast (US, Canada)
Hladno Pivo, Superhiks, Atheist Rap (Serbia)
The Baseballs (Austria)
Twin Atlantic (Montreux)
 Classic Hugo and the Dirty Dick Beaters (El Paso, Trieste, and Locarno only)
 Billy Talent (Tallinn)
 Volbeat (Nîmes)
 Black Rebel Motorcycle Club (Nîmes)
 The Stitches (Pomona and Tempe)
 Frank Turner (London)

Setlist
 "99 Revolutions"
 "Know Your Enemy" 
 "Stay the Night" 
 "Stop When the Red Lights Flash" 
 "Letterbomb"
 "Oh Love"
 "Holiday"
 "Boulevard of Broken Dreams" 
 "Stray Heart"
 "Burnout"
 "When I Come Around"
 "Waiting" 
 "Hitchin' a Ride" 
 "Going to Pasalacqua" 
 "Brain Stew" 
 "Welcome to Paradise" 
 "Longview"
 "St. Jimmy" 
 "Basket Case"
 "She"
 "King for a Day"
 "X-Kid" 
 "Minority" 
Encore
"American Idiot"
 "Jesus of Suburbia"
 "Brutal Love"

Tour dates

Festivals and other miscellaneous performances

This concert was a part of "Rock im Park"
This concert was a part of "Rock am Ring"
This concert was a part of the "Pinkpop Festival"
This concert was a part of the "Rock the Beach Festival"
This concert was a part of the "Bråvalla Festival"
This concert was a part of "Rock Werchter"
This concert was a part of the "Main Square Festival"
This concert was a part of the "Montreux Jazz Festival"
This concert was a part of "Moon and Stars"
This concert was a part of the "Festival de Nîmes"
This concert was a part of "Optimus Alive!"
This concert was a part of "Bilbao BBK Live"
This concert was a part of the Reading Festival
This concert was a part of the Leeds Festival

Personnel
Green Day
 Billie Joe Armstrong – lead vocals, harmonica, lead and rhythm guitars
 Mike Dirnt – bass, backing vocals
 Tré Cool – drums, percussion, backing vocals on "King For A Day/Shout"
 Jason White – lead and rhythm guitars, backing vocals
Additional Musicians
 Jason Freese – keyboards, piano, saxophone, accordion, backing vocals
 Jeff Matika – rhythm guitar, acoustic guitar, backing vocals

References

2012 concert tours
2013 concert tours
Green Day concert tours